Ray Rennahan, A.S.C. (May 1, 1896 – May 19, 1980) was a motion picture cinematographer.

Biography

For his work in films, he became one of the only six cinematographers to have a "star" on the Hollywood Walk of Fame, the other five being Haskell Wexler, Conrad L. Hall, J. Peverell Marley, Leon Shamroy and Hal Mohr.

He won two Academy Awards for Color Cinematography, for Gone with the Wind, with Ernest Haller in 1940, and Blood and Sand, with Ernest Palmer in 1942. He was also nominated in that category for Drums Along the Mohawk in 1940, with Bert Glennon; Down Argentine Way, with Leon Shamroy; The Blue Bird in 1941, with Arthur Miller; Louisiana Purchase in 1942, with Harry Hallenberger; For Whom the Bell Tolls in 1944; and Lady in the Dark in 1945.

Selected filmography

 Blood Test (1923)
 The Ten Commandments (1923)
 The Merry Widow (1925)
 Gold Diggers of Broadway (1929)
 The Vagabond King (1930)
 King of Jazz (1930)
 Whoopee! (1930)
 The Runaround (1931)
 Fanny Foley Herself (1931)
 Doctor X (1932)
 Mystery of the Wax Museum (1933)
 The Cat and the Fiddle (1934)
 Kid Millions (1934)
 Becky Sharp (1935)
 Ebb Tide (1937)
 Wings of the Morning (1937)
 Vogues of 1938 (1938)
 Kentucky (1938)
 Her Jungle Love (1938)
 Drums Along the Mohawk (1939)
 Gone with the Wind (1939)
 Chad Hanna (1940)
 Down Argentine Way (1940)
 The Blue Bird (1940)
 Blood and Sand (1941)
 Belle Starr (1941)
 That Night in Rio (1941)
 Louisiana Purchase (1941)
 For Whom the Bell Tolls (1943)
 Lady in the Dark (1944)
 The Three Caballeros (1944)
 Belle of the Yukon (1944)
 Up in Arms (1944)
 Incendiary Blonde (1945)
 It's a Pleasure (1945)
 A Thousand and One Nights (1945)
 Duel in the Sun (1946)
 California (1947)
 The Perils of Pauline (1947)
 Unconquered (1947)
 Whispering Smith (1948)
 The Paleface (1948)
 A Connecticut Yankee in King Arthur's Court (1949)
 Streets of Laredo (1949)
 The White Tower (1950)
 Silver City (1951)
 The Great Missouri Raid (1951)
Warpath (1951)
 Flaming Feather (1952)
 At Sword's Point (1952)
 Denver and Rio Grande (1952)
 Hurricane Smith (1952)
 Arrowhead (1953)
 Flight to Tangier (1953)
 Pony Express (1953)
 Stranger on Horseback (1955)
 Rage at Dawn (1955)
 Texas Lady (1955)
 A Lawless Street (1955)
 The Court Jester (1955)
 7th Cavalry (1956)
 The Guns of Fort Petticoat (1957)
 The Halliday Brand (1957)
 Terror in a Texas Town (1958)

External links 
 
 

1896 births
1980 deaths
American cinematographers
Best Cinematographer Academy Award winners
Burials at Forest Lawn Memorial Park (Hollywood Hills)